Vlasta Vrána (born 1950), is a Canadian actor of Czech descent.

Life and career
Vrána, born to Czech parents in Norway, moved to Canada at age four. He made his feature-film debut in Canadian filmmaker David Cronenberg's Shivers. Vrána has appeared in television shows and films, including The New Avengers, The Littlest Hobo, Choices, Spearfield's Daughter, The Kiss, War of the Worlds, After Amy, All Souls, Friday the 13th: the Series, Windsor Protocol, Lobby, Highlander III: The Sorcerer, Sirens, All Souls, Mom P.I., The Hitchhiker, Press Run, Waking the Dead, Varian's War, Pachamama, and The Blue Man.

In 2005 he received an Award of Excellence from ACTRA Montreal and the Richard Kind Award for Best Actor at the 2005 Trenton Film Festival for his lead role in B. P. Paquette's psychological drama, A Year in the Death of Jack Richards. Vrána played Fire Chief Wickersham in Secret Window and Booker (MPC) in The Day After Tomorrow.

Voice-acting credits include Assassin's Creed, Splinter Cell, Heavy Metal, Heavy Metal 2000 and The Mysterious Cities of Gold, documentaries and radio and TV commercials. He narrated the Canada Vignettes and other films for the National Film Board of Canada.

Filmography

 Shivers (1975) as Kresimer Sviben
 Rabid (1977) as Cop at Clinic
 One Man (1977) as Gendron's Colleague
 The New Avengers (1977, TV Series) as Karavitch
 Strangers at the Door (1977, Short) as Jan
 Back Alley Blue (1977, Short)
 Blackout (1978)
 Canada Vignettes (1978, Short) as Narrator
 L'homme en colère (1978) as Le gérant du club
 The Spirit Adventure: Night Flight (1979, TV Movie) as Radio Operator
 Meet the Martians (1979, Short) as Narrator
 No Fighting Habitat (1979) as Narrator
 The Littlest Hobo (1980, TV Series) as Policeman
 Atmos (1980, Documentary, short) as Narrator
 Happy Birthday to Me (1981) as Bartender
 Gas (1981) as Baron Stuyvesant
 Heavy Metal (1981) as Barbarian Leader (voice) (segment "Taarna")
 The Amateur (1981) as Guide
 Ulysses 31 (1981-1982, TV Series) as Zeus
 Astro Boy (1981) (voice, Cinelume English dub)
 Belle and Sebastian (1981) (voice, English dub)
 The Emperor of Peru (1982) as Policeman
 Hard Feelings (1982) as Mr. Holland
 End Game in Paris (1982, Short)
 A Room Full of Energy (1982, Short) as Narrator
 The Forbes Home (1983, Documentary short) as Narrator
 Illusion (1983, TV Movie) as Ben Grover
 The Mysterious Cities of Gold (1982-1983, TV Series) as Narrator and Kokapelt (English dub, voice)
 Candy the Striper (1983) as Guy at Bar
 Cook and Peary: The Race to the Pole (1983, TV Movie) as Murphy
 A Matter of Cunning (1983, TV Movie) as Ted Haskell
 Hey Babe! (1983) as Roy
 The Surrogate (1984) as Bill
 Charlie Grant's War (1984, TV Movie) as Police Chief
 The Adventures of the Little Koala (1984, TV Series) as Weather (voice)
 Secret Weapons (1985, TV Movie) as Ivan
 The Hitchhiker (1985, TV Series) as Mark Greenburg / Undercover Cop #2
 Breaking All the Rules (1985) as Detective
 One Step Away (1985)
 A Time to Live (1985, TV Movie) as Policeman Grosso
 The Blue Man (1985) as Scott
 The World Turned Upside Down (1985) as Narrator (voice)
 The World of David the Gnome (1985, TV Series) as Swift (voice; English dub)
 Bumpety Boo (1985, TV Series) (voice)
 Choices (1986, TV Movie) as Minister
 C.A.T. Squad (1986, TV Movie)
 The Morning Man (1986)
 Cat City (1986) as Mr. Gatto (English dub, voice)
 The Wonderful Wizard of Oz (1987, TV Series) (voice)
 He Shoots, He Scores (1986, TV Series) as Popov
 Keeping Track (1986) as Chuck
 Great Collections from the Montreal Botanical Garden (1986) as Narrator
 Age of the Rivers (1986) as Narrator
 Spearfield's Daughter (1986, TV Mini-Series) as Gerd
 The Lonely Passion of Brian Moore (1986, Documentary) as Narrator (voice)
 Life on Ice (1986, Documentary short) as Narrator
 Amerika (1987, TV Mini-Series) as Sergei
 Ford: The Man and the Machine (1987, TV Movie) as William Murphy
 Nowhere to Hide (1987) as Sonny Cambria
 First Offender (1987, TV Movie) (uncredited)
  (1987, TV Movie) as Katsender
 The Man Who Stole Dreams (1987, Short) as Narrator (voice)
 Dreams of a Land (1987, Short) as Narrator
 The Gnomes' Great Adventure (1987, original version) as Swift
 Arctic River (1987, Documentary short) as Narrator
 Equatorial River (1987, Documentary short) Narrator
 A Safety Net''' (1987, Documentary short) as Narrator
 Mario, Mike and the Great Gretzky (1988, Documentary) as amusing Narrator
 God Bless the Child (1988, TV Movie) as Harold Matthews
 C.A.T. Squad: Python Wolf (1988, TV Movie)
 Edge of Ice (1988, Documentary) as Narrator
 Hitting Home (1988, TV Movie) as Phil Grande
 The Kiss (1988) as Bishop
 Midnight Magic (1988, TV Movie) as Ryan Burr
 The Mills of Power (1988)
 Red Earth, White Earth (1989, TV Movie) as William
 Day One (1989, TV Movie) as Hans Bethe
 Champagne Charlie (1989, TV Movie)
 Jesus of Montreal (1989) as Fr. Leclerc (English dub, voice)
 Eddie and the Cruisers II: Eddie Lives! (1989) as Frank
 Nail Soup: Scandinavian Folktale (1989) as Narrator
 Saban's Adventures of Peter Pan (1989) (voice)
 Hallmark Hall of Fame (1990, TV Series) as Paul Revere
 War of the Worlds (1990, TV Series) as Jonathan Laporte
 Friday the 13th: The Series (1989-1990, TV Series) Webster Eby / Sheriff
 Falling Over Backwards (1990) as Drunk
 Angel Square (1990) as Logg
 Whispers (1990) as Sheriff Laurenski
 The Real Story of Humpty Dumpty (1990, Short) The King
 Money (1991) as Mel Glatzman
 Scanners II: The New Order (1991) as Lt. Gelson
 Deadly Surveillance (1991, TV Movie) as Palatzo
 Saban's Adventures of the Little Mermaid (1991) (voice)
 The Jungle Book (1991) as Grizzle
 Counterstrike (1990-1991, TV Series) as Detective Samuelson and Lt. Samuelson
 Bob in a Bottle (1991) (voice)
 Saban's Adventures of Pinocchio (1991) (voice)
 Mom P.I. (1991, TV Series)
 On Strike: The Winnipeg General Strike, 1919 (1991, Short documentary) as Narrator (voice)
 Gulliver's Travels (1992) (voice)
 Sharky and George (1992) (voice)
 Sandokan (1992) (voice)
 A Bunch of Munsch (1992, TV Series) (voice)
 The Legend of White Fang (1992, TV Series) (voice)
 Urban Angel (1991-1992, TV Series) as Lieutenant Drabeck
 Christopher Columbus (1993, TV Series) (voice)
 Spirou (1993, TV Series) (voice)
 The Adventures of Grady Greenspace (1993, TV Series) as Rafia Rat
 Around the World in 80 Dreams (1993, TV Series) (voice)
 Street Legal (1989-1993, TV Series) as Howard Champion / Mario Pestano
 The Rise and Fall of English Montreal (1993, Documentary) as Narrator
 Flight from Justice (1993, TV Movie) as Nathan
 Vendetta II: The New Mafia (1993, TV Movie) as Benny
 The Lifeforce Experiment (1994, TV Movie) as Dr. Robbie Allman
 Brainscan (1994) as Frank
 Papa Beaver's Storytime (1994, TV Series) (voice)
 Warriors (1994) as Mr. Parker
 Stalked (1994) as Sanders
 Highlander III: The Sorcerer (1994) as Vorisek
 Relative Fear (1994) as Mr. Schulman
 Aventures dans le Grand Nord (1995, TV Series) as Jacques
 Sirens (1995, TV Series) as Arnold Freize
 Hiroshima (1995, TV Movie) as Gen. Tom Farrell
 Crosswinds (1995, TV Movie) as Harry
 For Love Alone: The Ivana Trump Story (1996, TV Movie) as Dr. Zimmerman 
 Midnight in Saint Petersburg (1996, TV Movie) as Hans Schreiber
 Due South (1996, TV Series) as Henri Cloutier
 Hollow Point (1996) as FBI Agent in Chase
 Marked Man (1996) as Warden Jackson
 The Magical Adventures of Quasimodo (1996, TV Series) as Frollo / Prison Guard
 Mother Night (1996) as August Krapptauer
 Gotti (1996, TV Movie) as Romual Piecyk
 Hawk's Vengeance (1996) as Duquesne
 Natural Enemy (1996) as Stanley
 The Busy World of Richard Scarry (1993-1996, TV Series) (voice)
 Jagged Alliance: Deadly Games (1996, Video Game) (voice)
 While My Pretty One Sleeps (1997, TV Movie) as Bishop
 Night of the Demons 3 (1997) as Dewhurst
 Stranger in the House (1997) as Alex Alexander
 The Peacekeeper (1997) as General Douglas
 The Assignment (1997) as KGB Head Officer
 Windsor Protocol (1997, TV Movie) as Hardy's Aide
 Lobby (1997, TV Series) as Jacques Baldwin
 Kayla (1997) as Lyman Snow
 Night Hood (1997, TV Series) (voice)
 The Little Lulu Show (1997, TV Series) (voice)
 Princess Sissi (1997, TV Series) (voice)
 Ivanhoe (1997, TV Series) Reginald Front-de-Boeuf
 The Hunger (1997-1998, TV Series) as Boatman / Rhys
 Glory and Hunger (1998, TV Movie) as Morris Jesup
 Thunder Point (1998, TV Movie) (voice)
 Escape from Wildcat Canyon (1996) as Tully
 The Ultimate Weapon (1998) as 'Top' Drummond
 The Girl Next Door (1998, TV Movie) as Howard Poolin
 Team S.O.S. (1998, TV Series) (voice)
 Flight Squad (1998, TV Series) (voice)
 Dog's World (1998, TV Series) (voice)
 Animal Crackers (1998, TV Series) (voice)
 The Country Mouse and the City Mouse Adventures (1998, TV Series) (voice)
 To a Different Beat (1998, Documentary) as Narrator
 L'ombre de l'épervier (1998, TV Series) as De LaRosbille
 Cold Squad (1999, TV Series) as Valentin Kucharek
 Bonnano: A Godfather's Story (1999, TV Movie) as Franklin Roosevelt
 The Collectors (1999, TV Movie) as Sgt Grander
 Eye of the Beholder (1999) as Mr. Hugo Sr.
 Grey Owl (1999) as Harry Champlin
 Emily of New Moon (1999, TV Series) as Wendall McKay
 The Legend of Sleepy Hollow (1999, TV Movie) as Mr. Van Tassle
 Running Home (1999) as Robinson
 The Maurice Rocket Richard Story (1999, TV Series) as Voix à la radio
 Revenge of the Land (1999, TV Movie)
 Ripley's Believe It or Not! (1999, TV Series) (voice)
 Billy and Buddy (1999, TV Series) (voice)
 Bizby (1999, TV Series) (voice)
 Turtle Island (1999, TV Series) (voice)
 A Miss Mallard Mystery (1999, TV Series) (voice)
 Waking the Dead (2000) as Priest at Sarah's Funeral
 Press Run (2000) as Sam Kettle
 Revenge (2000) as Dan McCartney
 Reaper (2000) as Sheriff Norris
 Believe (2000) as Mortimer Higgins
 Where the Money Is (2000) as Jewelry Store Employee
 Heavy Metal 2000 (2000) as Street Vendor (voice)
 The List (2000) (voice)
 Cause of Death (2001) as Al Bailey
 Heart: The Marilyn Bell Story (2001, TV Movie) as George McBlair
 All Souls (2001, TV Series) as Dr. Lyman Brisco
 Varian's War (2001, TV Movie) as Franz Werfel
 Dr. Quinn, Medicine Woman: The Heart Within (2001, TV Movie) as Dr. Charles Cook
 L'or (2001, TV Series) as Vlad Kovak
 After Amy (2001, TV Movie)
 Protection (2001) as Shimanski
 Wunschpunsch (2000-2001) as Maledictus Maggot (English version, voice)
 Simon in the Land of Chalk Drawings (2001, TV Series) (voice)
 Iron Nose (2001, TV Series) (voice)
 Wombat City (2001, TV Series) (voice)
 Belphegor (2001, TV Series) (voice)
 The Lost World (2001, TV Movie) (voice)
 Fidel (2001, Documentary) as Narrator
 Requiem for Fanny (2001, Documentary) as Narrator
 Matthew Blackheart: Monster Smasher (2002, TV Movie) as Franklin D. Roosevelt
 Redeemer (2002, TV Movie) as Edward Chase
 Big Wolf on Campus (1999-2002, TV Series) as Professor Flugelhoff / King Augustus
 Just a Walk in the Park (2002, TV Movie) as Publisher
 The Book of Eve (2002) as Steve Lock
 Scent of Danger (2002, TV Movie) as Dr. York
 Tom Clancy's Splinter Cell (2002, Video Game)
 Alone We Stand (2002, Short) as Narrator
 Pig City (2002, TV Series) (voice)
 Levity (2003) as Man on Parole Board
 Lucky Luke (2001-2003, TV Series) as Joe Dalton (voice)
 Rudy: The Rudy Giuliani Story (2003, TV Movie) as Ray Harding
 The Human Stain (2003) as Solly Tabak
 Timeline (2003) as Monk
 Bad Apple (2004, TV Movie) as Fleisig
 Secret Window (2004) as Fire Chief Wickersham
 The Day After Tomorrow (2004) as Booker (MPC)
 Wicker Park (2004) as Jeweller
 Baby for Sale (2004, TV Movie)
 A Year in the Death of Jack Richards(2004) as Jack Richards
 Manners of Dying (2004) as Doctor Lowe
 When Angels Come to Town (2004, TV Movie) as Franz
 Tripping the Rift (2004, TV Series) (voice)
 Life and Times, John Paul II (2004, TV Series) (voice)
 Ocean Tales (2004, TV Series) (voice)
 The Three Pigs (2004, TV Series) (voice)
 Potatoes and Dragons (2004, TV Series) (voice)
 Ratz (2004, TV Series) (voice)
 Winx Club (2004, TV Series) (voice, English dub)
 Dragon Hunters (2004, TV Series) (voice)
 The Boy (2004, TV Series) (voice)
 The Tournament (2005, TV Series) as Coach Jenkins (Season 1)
 Crimes of Passion (2005, TV Movie) as Malcolm McBradden
 Spookley the Square Pumpkin (2005) as Narrator (voice)
 Human Trafficking (2005, TV Mini-Series) as Tommy
 Canadian Case Files (2005, TV Series) as Narrator (voice)
 Black Eyed Dog (2006) as Andreas
 My Goldfish is Evil (2006, TV Series) (voice)
 A Life Interrupted (2007, TV Movie) as Committee Chairman
 I Me Wed (2007, TV Movie) as Roy
 Race to Mars (2007, TV Mini-Series) as Space Agency Narrator (voice)
 Dr. Jekyll and Mr. Hyde (2008, TV Movie) as Judge Shoehan
 Lava Storm (2008, TV Movie) as Mike Wilson
 The Cutting Edge: Chasing the Dream (2008, TV Movie) as Official
 WarGames: The Dead Code (2008) as Ivan Prokosh
 The Christmas Choir (2008, TV Movie)
 Dead Like Me: Life After Death (2009) as Gregor
 Carny (2009, TV Movie) as Pastor Owen
 The Last Templar (2009, TV Series) as Taxi Driver
 The Cutting Edge: Fire and Ice (2010, TV Movie) as Maitre D'
 Arctic Blast (2010) as Narrator (voice)
 Territories (2010) as Sheriff White
 Deus Ex: Human Revolution (2011, Video Game) as Detective Chase (voice)
 Assassin's Creed: Revelations (2011, Video Game) as Manuel Palailogos (voice)
 Upside Down (2012) as Mr. Hunt
 Pinocchio (2012) as Mangiafuoco / The Jailer (English dub, voice)
 Far Cry 3: Blood Dragon (2013, Video Game) as Introductory Narrator (voice)
 Red 2 (2013) as General McKennon
 The Informant (2013) as Contrôleur Nichols
 Gurov and Anna (2014) as Audiobook Narrator (voice)
 The Perfect Husband (2014) as Gardener
 Northpole: Open for Christmas (2015, TV Movie) as Salvation Army Santa
 Race (2016) as St-John
 19-2 (2014-2016, TV Series) as Ben's Father
 Deus Ex: Mankind Divided (2016, Video Game) as Otar Botkoveli (voice)
 The Glass Castle (2017) as Mr. Lehocky
 The Zone (2017) as Stalker
 Pachamama (2018) as Shaman
 Les Misérables (2018, TV Mini-Series) as Voice Director
 Swept Up by Christmas  (2020 TV film) as Alan Hawthorne
 Hall (2020) as Peter
 Felix and the Treasure of Morgäa (Félix et le trésor de Morgäa) - 2021 as Tom (English version)

References

External links

1950 births
Living people
Canadian male film actors
Canadian male television actors
Canadian male voice actors
Canadian voice directors
Canadian people of Czech descent
Norwegian people of Czech descent
Naturalized citizens of Canada
Norwegian emigrants to Canada
20th-century Canadian male actors
21st-century Canadian male actors